Pop 2 is the fourth mixtape by English singer and songwriter Charli XCX, released on 15 December 2017 by Asylum Records. Executive produced by A.G. Cook of PC Music, sessions for the mixtape began just several months before its release and featured a wide variety of guest contributions. The project received acclaim from music critics, and was backed by the single "Out of My Head" featuring Alma and Tove Lo.

Background
In December 2014, before the release of her sophomore album Sucker, Charli XCX revealed she was already planning her third studio album. She stated that it would be inspired by Japanese pop music and sound like "another planet up in the clouds" and "intensely weird and childlike". In July 2015, she shared in an interview that she had begun working on her third album with Scottish producer Sophie in Los Angeles and described it as "the most pop thing, and the most electronic thing" she had ever done. BloodPop and Stargate were also confirmed to be involved in the album's production. In July and August 2015, Charli XCX co-headlined a US tour with Jack Antonoff, but on 21 August she announced that, for "personal reasons", a planned second leg of the tour would not go ahead.

In October 2015, Charli XCX released the song "Vroom Vroom", on the Beats 1 Radio Show, then claiming it would be the first song released from her third studio album. On 26 February 2016, the Vroom Vroom EP was released, under Charli XCX's own imprint record label, Vroom Vroom Recordings. All songs on the EP were produced by Sophie. That July, it was announced that British producer A. G. Cook, founder of record label PC Music, had signed on as Charli's creative director, and the following month, she announced in an interview with The Fader that her album was finished and would be released in 2017.  When describing the project, Charli stated the album would be split into two sides, half being "straight-up pop" and the other half being "club orientated". In October 2016, the album was confirmed for a May 2017 release, and the lead single "After the Afterparty" was released.

Several new tracks were premiered live over the following months, including "Roll With Me", "No Angel", and "Bounce", however in February 2017, it was announced that the album was delayed and expected to be released that September instead. In lieu of the delayed album, she announced a new mixtape titled Number 1 Angel would be released in February, recorded within two weeks with Cook without permission from her record label, Atlantic, meanwhile unreleased Charli XCX tracks began to leak on the internet. The mixtape was delayed until March due to label conflicts. In May 2017, the album was delayed again with an expected release date for spring 2018, and a second single, "Boys", was released along with a music video directed by Charli XCX herself, with additional direction from Sarah McColgan. The video, which featured cameos from a wide variety of male celebrities including Joe Jonas and Wiz Khalifa, went viral, racking up almost 3 million views within a day. During August, more leaks from the album sessions appeared online, and the project was scrapped.

Recording
Recording for Pop 2 began in September 2017, just two months before the mixtape was to be completed, with Charli reaching out to producer and PC Music founder A. G. Cook to suggest they work on a new project following their previous mixtape Number 1 Angel (2017) appointing him as executive producer. Cook stated that "we wanted it to feel like a complete restart in terms of the image and style of it" in comparison to their previous project. The majority of recording took place in Alicia Keys' old New York studio, with other sessions occurring in London. Charli extensively utilized Auto-Tune, which Cook experimented with and manipulated on particular tracks. She stated that "the mixtape is in this very free, fast, and experimental world. But it's also still intended to be pop. It's what I naturally gravitate towards."

Charli XCX explained the decision to put out Number 1 Angel and Pop 2 as mixtapes instead of studio albums in a 2019 interview with The Fader:
Maybe I just wasn't sure people wanted it from me, honestly. Also, I'm signed to a major label, so the second you call something an album, there's all this stress and fear and pressure and scheduling. They're like, "Oh, she's putting an album out. When's Ed Sheeran releasing his album? We got to make sure it doesn't go anywhere near that," and all that. It's like a schedule. The second you just change the language to mixtape, nobody cares. So, I was just like, "Cool, I'm doing mixtapes then." Then it was just like there was no kind of logistical stress, even though it's the same thing. I mean, it's 10 original songs, it's artwork, it's features, it's whatever, it's the same.

Collaborations which appear on the record include Canadian singer Carly Rae Jepsen, Brazilian singer and drag queen Pabllo Vittar, Estonian rapper Tommy Cash, German pop singer Kim Petras and Korean-American hip hop artist Jay Park among others. Charli stated that "this mixtape isn't necessarily about me – it's really about giving everybody their moment to own the song." The mixtape was to feature a contribution from rapper Lil Peep, which was shelved following his death in November.

A reworked version of "Track 10", titled "Blame It on Your Love", was later released in May 2019 as the second single from her third studio album Charli.

Singles
The first single from Pop 2, "Out of My Head" featuring Tove Lo and Alma was released on 8 December 2017 along the pre-order of the mixtape on digital platforms. The song "Unlock It" featuring Kim Petras and Jay Park was premiered on 11 December 2017 on radio program Beats 1, being named its release day's World Record. Another track called "I Got It" featuring Brooke Candy, Cupcakke and Pabllo Vittar was released on 13 December 2017 as the final promotional single before the mixtape's official release.

Critical reception

At review aggregate site Metacritic, Pop 2 has an average score of 84 out of 100, based on eight reviews, indicating "universal acclaim". Meaghan Garvey of Pitchfork, who gave the album an 8.4/10, called it "the best full-length work of both Charli and PC Music's respective careers," opining that "though Pop 2 sounds like the future, even more delightful is the way it hybridizes sounds from the past two decades of weirdo electronics." Ludovic Hunter-Tilney of the Financial Times wrote that Charli XCX "stands out as a paragon of progressiveness," opining that "on the majority of the tracks Charli and her producer Cook deploy their meta-pop tactics with a skilful sense of dramatic engagement."

In 2019, Pitchfork ranked the album 40th in its list of "The 200 Best Albums of the 2010s". In the album's entry, Hazel Cills considered it Charli XCX's "best full-length to date" and felt that throughout it, she "solidifies her mastery of the strange, wonderful new pop world she continues to build."

Track listing

Notes
 "Delicious" features a brief sample of Charli XCX's 2014 single "Boom Clap", with the song being depicted as a phone ringtone.
"Unlock It" samples A. G. Cook's 2014 single "Beautiful". Following the resurgence of the song's popularity on TikTok, it was retitled "Unlock it (Lock It)" on streaming platforms in May 2021.
"Track 10" acts as a mashup of sorts between the then-unreleased Charli XCX single "Blame It on Your Love", and Life Sim's 2015 single, "IDL".

Pop 2 Tour 

In addition to the Pop 2 performances, Charli additionally hosted and performed at numerous afterparties during the Reputation Stadium Tour during this period, further promoting the mixtape and singles.

Personnel
Credits adapted from Tidal.

Musicians

 Charli XCX – lead vocals
 A. G. Cook – programming , synthesizer 
 EasyFun – programming , synthesizer 
 Sophie – programming 
 Ö – backing vocals and programming 
 David Gamson – synthesizer and programming 
 Umru – programming 
 Caroline Polachek – backing vocals 
 Life Sim – synthesizer 
 King Henry – programming 
 Lil Data – synthesizer 
 Noonie Bao – backing vocals 

Production

 A. G. Cook – executive producer, engineer 
 Stuart Hawkes – mastering engineer
 Geoff Swan – mixer
 Noah Passovoy – engineer 
 Brendan Morawski – engineer 
 Stargate – vocal producers

References

2017 mixtape albums
Asylum Records albums
Charli XCX albums
Albums produced by Stargate
Albums produced by David Gamson
Experimental pop albums
Avant-pop albums
Albums produced by Sophie (musician)
Albums produced by A. G. Cook